Taling Chan may refer to:

 Taling Chan District in Bangkok, Thailand
 Taling Chan Subdistrict, Bangkok, within the district
 Taling Chan Subdistrict in Nuea Khlong District, Krabi
 Taling Chan Subdistrict in Tha Sala District, Nakhon Si Thammarat
 Taling Chan Subdistrict in Bang Pa-in District, Phra Nakhon Si Ayutthaya
 Taling Chan Subdistrict in Bannang Sata District, Yala
 Taling Chan Subdistrict in Chana District, Songkhla
 Taling Chan Subdistrict, Saraburi, in Mueang Saraburi District
 Taling Chan Subdistrict in Ban Dan Lan Hoi District, Sukhothai
 Taling Chan Subdistrict in Mueang Suphan Buri District